Plateaux Department (Republic of the Congo)
Plateaux Department (Gabon)
Plateaux Region, Togo
Plateaux District, D.R. of the Congo